Randy Staub is a Canadian recording engineer. He has been nominated for the Juno Awards' "Recording Engineer of the Year" award 12 times. He won in 2002 for the songs "How You Remind Me" and "Too Bad" by Nickelback.

Staub also mixed Alice in Chains' fourth studio album, Black Gives Way to Blue.

Awards

Juno Awards

References

External links

Juno Award for Recording Engineer of the Year winners
Canadian audio engineers
Living people
Year of birth missing (living people)